Under forvandlingens lov (Under the Law of Change) or Jo tykkere, jo bedre (The Thicker, the Better) is a Norwegian silent film from 1911. It is the oldest known surviving Norwegian film, and it was directed by Halfdan Nobel Roede. The film has been characterized as an erotic melodrama, and it premiered in Kristiania (now Oslo) on December 4, 1911. The script for the film was written by Peter Lykke-Seest under the pseudonym Søløvenskjold Pedersen.

In 1992, Gunnar Iversen claimed that Roede's lost 1912 silent film I frihetens bur (In the Cage of Freedom) is actually the same film as Under forvandlingens lov.

Plot
The film is a jealousy drama in which Camillo and Francisca discover that their spouses Julia and Arthur are having an affair with each other. They drug the unfaithful spouses and lock them in separate cages until they get tired of each other, and the spouses find each other again and become happy. The film's plot includes a visit to an outdoor variety show. Four songs from the variety show are incorporated into the film. The opera singer Hans Ingi Hedemark performs there, Bertha Ræstad dances a cake-walk, Botten Soot dances an Egyptian dance, and Hedvig Dietrichson dances the "Dance of Chopin."

Cast
 Birger Widt as Camillo
 Olaf Hansson as his friend Arthur
 Signe Danning as Camillo's wife Julia
 Ingeborg Hauge as Arthur's wife Franziska
 Hans Ingi Hedemark as a singer
 Bertha Ræstad as a dancer
 Botten Soot as a dancer
 Hedvig Dietrichson as a dancer
 Christian Danning

References

External links
 
 Under forvandlingens lov at Norsk filmografi

1911 films
Norwegian drama films
Norwegian black-and-white films
Norwegian silent short films
1911 drama films
1911 short films
Silent drama films